Arthur Waters (1879–1952) was an English footballer who played in the Football League for Stockport County and Southern League for Cardiff City and Swindon Town.

Career
Waters joined Stockport County in 1904 but was hospitalised during his first season with the club due to a severe bout of pneumonia.

In August 1911, Waters signed for Southern Football League Second Division side Cardiff City to rejoin his former Stockport manager Fred Stewart who had recently been appointed. Waters was named club captain upon his arrival, replacing Bob Lawrie, and made his debut in a 3–1 victory over Kettering Town on the opening day of the 1911–12 season.

References

1879 births
1952 deaths
English footballers
Association football defenders
English Football League players
Birmingham City F.C. players
Walsall F.C. players
Swindon Town F.C. players
Stockport County F.C. players
Cardiff City F.C. players
Southern Football League players